Saturnin Fabre (4 April 1884 – 4 October 1961) was a French film actor.

Selected filmography

 La rafale (1920) - comte de Bréchebel
 Mademoiselle de La Seiglière (1921)
 The Road Is Fine (1930) - Le professeur Pique
 Love Songs (1930) - M, Crispin
 My Cousin from Warsaw (1931) - Saint-Hilaire
 Atout cœur (1931) - Lefol
 The Darling of Paris (1931) - Hector
 The Improvised Son (1932) - M. Brassart
 The Premature Father (1933) - Le père Puma
 Son autre amour (1934) - Monsieur Léopard - le directeur
 Casanova (1934) - M. Binetti
 Les deux canards (1934) - Le baron de Saint-Amour
 L'enfant du carnaval (1934) - Hubert
 On a trouvé une femme nue (1934) - Le marquis de la Ferronière
 Mam'zelle Spahi (1934) - Le colonel du 32ème de Spahis
 L'hôtel du libre échange (1934) - Mathieu
 Le roman d'un jeune homme pauvre (1936) - Bévellan
 Excursion Train (1936) - M. Bring
 A Hen on a Wall (1936) - Monsieur Amédée
 Seven Men, One Woman (1936) - Le député Derain
 La guerre des gosses (1936) - L'instituteur Simon
 You Are Me (1936) - Adolphe Robinet - le résident
 The Bureaucrats (1936) - Le tondu
 Pépé le Moko (1937) - Le Grand Père
 Vous n'avez rien à déclarer? (1937) - Le professeur Puget
 Les dégourdis de la 11ème (1937) - L'inspecteur-général Burnous
 Ignace (1937) - Le baron Gédéon des Orfrais
 Le cantinier de la coloniale (1937) - Le capitaine
 Désiré (1937) - Adrien Corniche
 Le chanteur de minuit (1937) - Garnier
 Le gagnant (1937)
 The Woman Thief (1938) - L'académicien / L'accademico
 Golden Venus (1938) - Le duc de Sartène
 Gargousse (1938) - Joseph Lebrennois - le maire
 Beautiful Star (1938) - Lemarchal
 Tricoche and Cacolet (1938) - Monsieur Van der Pouf
 Le dompteur (1938) - Maître Anatole Dupont
 The White Slave (1939) - Djemal Pacha
 Coral Reefs (1939) - Hobson
 Les otages (1939) - Rossignol, le châtelain
 Monsieur Brotonneau (1939) - M. de Berville
 Nine Bachelors (1939) - Adhémar Colombinet de la Jonchère
 Love Cavalcade (1939) - Monsieur Dupont-Dufort
 Le Corsaire (1939)
 Beating Heart (1940) - Monsieur Aristide
 Le club des soupirants (1941) - Cabarus
 Ne bougez plus (1941) - Andromaque de Miremir
 Opéra-musette (1942) - Monsieur Honoré
 Mademoiselle Swing (1942) - Grégoire Dimitresco
 La Nuit fantastique (1942) - Le professeur Thalès
 Les ailes blanches (1943) - Siméon
 Marie-Martine (1943) - L'oncle Parpain
 The Midnight Sun (1943) - Ireniev
 Jeannou (1943) - Frochard
 Le merle blanc (1944) - Jules Leroy
 Fausse alerte (1945) - Monsieur Dalban
 Lunegarde (1946) - Monsieur de Vertumne
 Christine se marie (1946) - Sébastien Aurelle - le musicien
 A Friend Will Come Tonight (1946) - Philippe Prunier
 Les J3 (1946) - Le proviseur du lycée
 Jeux de femmes (1946) - L'oncle Hubert
 On demande un ménage (1946) - Horace Rouvière
 Gates of the Night (1946) - Monsieur Sénéchal
 Ploum, ploum, tra-la-la (1947) - Basile Samara
 Si jeunesse savait... (1948) - Abdul
 Scandals of Clochemerle (1948) - Alexandre Bourdillat
 Doctor Laennec (1949) - Laennec père
 La veuve et l'innocent (1949) - Achille Panoyau - l'accusé
 Miquette (1950) - Le professeur
 Rome Express (1950) - Le marquis Aldebert de la Tour Mirande
 The Girl from Maxim's (1950) - Le général Petypon du Grêlé
 The Marriage of Mademoiselle Beulemans (1950) - M. Delpierre
 Les petites Cardinal (1951) - Horace Cardinal
 Holiday for Henrietta (1952) - Antoine - un consommateur
 Carnaval (1953) - Dr. Caberlot
 Virgile (1953) - Le président
 The Most Wanted Man (1953) - W.W. Stone, l'avocat
 It's the Paris Life (1954) - Comte Gontran de Barfleur
 Service Entrance (1954) - Monsieur Delecluze (final film role)

References

External links

1884 births
1961 deaths
People from Sens
French male film actors
French male silent film actors
French male stage actors
20th-century French male actors